The 1988–89 UTEP Miners men's basketball team represented the University of Texas at El Paso in the 1988–89 college basketball season. The team was led by head coach Don Haskins. The Miners finished 26–7 (11–5 in WAC), won the WAC tournament championship, and reached the second round of the NCAA tournament.

Senior Tim Hardaway completed his eligibility as the school's career leading in scoring, assists, and steals.

Roster

Schedule and results

|-
!colspan=9 style=| Regular season

|-
!colspan=9 style=| WAC tournament

|-
!colspan=9 style=| NCAA tournament

Rankings

Awards and honors
Tim Hardaway – WAC Player of the Year, Honorable Mention AP All-American

NBA draft

References

UTEP Miners men's basketball seasons
Utep
Utep